Burgage is a medieval land term used in Great Britain and Ireland, well established by the 13th century.

A burgage was a town ("borough" or "burgh") rental property (to use modern terms), owned by a king or lord. The property ("burgage tenement") usually, and distinctly, consisted of a house on a long and narrow plot of land, with a narrow street frontage. Rental payment ("tenure") was usually in the form of money, but each "burgage tenure" arrangement was unique and could include services.

As populations grew "burgage plots" could be split into smaller additional units. (Amalgamation was not so common until the second half of the 19th century.)

Burgage tenures were usually money-based, in contrast to rural tenures, which were usually services-based. In Saxon times the rent was called a landgable or hawgable.

History
Burgage was the basis of the right to vote in many boroughs sending members to the House of Commons before 1832. In these boroughs the right to vote was attached to the occupation of particular burgage tenements. These burgages could be freely bought and sold, and the owner of the tenement was entitled to convey the right to vote for the duration of the election to another person, their 'nominee', who could then vote. The vote of each person entitled to the franchise was a matter of public record. Therefore the owner could monitor their nominees' votes. By purchasing the majority of the burgages one rich person could acquire the right to elect a Member of Parliament. Such burgage boroughs were called pocket boroughs. Most of the burgage boroughs had become pocket boroughs in this way by the time of the Great Reform Act 1832. The practice was abolished by the 1832 Act, which applied a uniform voting right to all boroughs.

In medieval England and Scotland and some parts of the Welsh Marches burgage plots or burgage tenements were inclosed fields extending the confines of a town, established by the lord of the manor, as divisions of the 'open' manorial fields. The burgesses (equivalents of "burghers") to whom these tracts were allotted, as tenants of the enclosed lands, paid a cash rent instead of, as previously, feudal service. In 1207, for instance, Maurice Paynell, the Lord of the Manor of Leeds, granted a charter to "his burgesses of Leeds" to build a 'new town', and so created the first borough of Leeds, Briggate, a street running north from the River Aire.

These burgesses had to be freemen: those who were entitled to practise a trade within the town and to participate in electing members of the town's ruling council.

In the very earliest chartered foundations, predating the Norman Conquest, the burgage plots were simply the ploughland strips of pre-existing agrarian settlements. In towns like Burford in Oxfordshire and Chipping Campden in Gloucestershire, Bromyard in Herefordshire, and Cricklade in Wiltshire, the property on the road frontage extends in a very long garden plot behind the dwelling even today, as English property boundaries have remained very stable. In South Zeal, in Devon, burgage plots were known as "borough acres".

Burgage grants were also common in Ireland; for example, when the town of Wexford received its royal charter in 1418, English settlers were encouraged into the town and were given burgage plots at a rent of one shilling per year.

See also
History of English land law
Land tenure
Grid plan

References

Medieval English Towns - Glossary
The Local Historian's Encyclopedia by John Richardson -

Further reading

  T.R. Slater, The Analysis of Burgage Patterns in Medieval Towns, Area, Vol. 13, no. 3, 1981

External links
Wiltshire County Council: Burgage plots
Discovering Leeds: Briggate

History of agriculture in the United Kingdom
Feudalism in the British Isles
Real estate in the United Kingdom
Local government in England
Land tenure